Park Hwan-hee (born October 13, 1990) is a South Korean actress and model. She began to be known for being in the 2016 popular television series Descendants of the Sun.

Personal life
Park married rapper Bill Stax on July 30, 2011 and divorced 15 months later. They have one son, named Shin Seop.

Filmography

Television series

Music video appearances

References

External links
 

South Korean television actresses
1990 births
Living people
21st-century South Korean actresses